Binnenstad (English: Inner city) is a neighbourhood in Maastricht, Netherlands. Until 2007, it was officially named City. As its name suggests, it is the most centrally located area of Maastricht.

Notable features
 Dinghuis, a Medieval courthouse
 The Dominicanenkerk (Dominican Church), a former church now housing a book shop
 Entre Deux, a newly rebuilt shopping centre
 The 'Hoge Brug/Hoeg Brögk' (High Bridge, built 2003), connecting the Binnenstad to Wyck-Céramique
 The Markt with the city hall of Maastricht
 The Onze-Lieve-Vrouweplein with the Basilica of Our Lady, Maastricht (Basiliek van Onze-Lieve-Vrouw-Tenhemelopneming)
 The Vrijthof with the Basilica of Saint Servatius (Sint-Servaasbasiliek) and Protestant Sint-Janskerk 
 Treasury of the Basilica of Saint Servatius
 Sint Servaasbrug, 13th-century arch-bridge over the Maas
 The Stokstraat area (Stokstraatkwartier)

Impressions

Location

Neighbourhoods of Maastricht